Irving Kahn (December 19, 1905 – February 24, 2015) was an American investor and philanthropist. He was the oldest living active investor. He was an early disciple of Benjamin Graham, who popularized the value investing methodology. Kahn began his career in 1928 and continued to work until his death. He was chairman of Kahn Brothers Group, Inc., the privately owned investment advisory and broker-dealer firm that he founded with his sons, Thomas and Alan, in 1978.

Kahn was the oldest active money manager on Wall Street. He made his first trade—a short sale of a copper mining company—in the summer of 1929, months before the famous market crash in October of the same year.

Early life and education  
Kahn was born on December 19, 1905, in New York City to Mamie (née Friedman; 1880–1946) and Saul Henry Kahn (1875–1964). He attended the City College of New York and went on to serve as the second teaching assistant to Benjamin Graham at Columbia Business School. At the time, other notable students and/or teaching assistants to Graham included future Berkshire Hathaway chairman Warren Buffett and future value investors William J. Ruane, Walter J. Schloss, Charles Brandes, among others. Graham had such an enormous influence on his students that both Kahn and Buffett named their sons after him. Kahn named his third son, born in 1942, Thomas Graham, and Buffett, his first son, born in 1954, Howard Graham.

Investment career 
Kahn was a Chartered Financial Analyst and among the first round of applicants to take the CFA exam. He was a founding member of the New York Society of Security Analysts and the Financial Analysts' Journal. Kahn was also a former director of Teleregister Corp., Hugo Stinnes Co., Grand Union Stores, Kings County Lighting, West Chemical, and Willcox & Gibbs. He was the president of the New York City Job and Career Center and was a trustee emeritus of the Jewish Foundation for Education of Women.

In a magazine article in 2002, he was quoted as saying: "I'm at the stage in life where I get a lot of pleasure out of finding a cheap stock," adding that his research still pushed him to work evenings and weekends. His son Thomas, then and still currently president of Kahn Brothers Group, said, "My father continues to research ideas and talk to companies. One of the nice things about this business is that there's no mandatory retirement age, and you allegedly get wiser as you get older."

Personal life 
Kahn, his sisters, and his brother were, collectively, the world's oldest living quartet of siblings. Kahn himself lived to 109. His sister, Helen Reichert (1901–2011), nicknamed "Happy", died seven weeks before her 110th birthday. The youngest sibling, Peter Keane (1910–2014), died at the age of 103. Kahn's other sister, Lee (1903–2005), died at the age of 101. Kahn outlived his son Donald, who died suddenly on January 16, 2015, at the age of 79.

Irving Kahn died on February 24, 2015, aged 109. His death was reported through a brief obituary in the New York Times on February 26, 2015. No specific cause of death was given.

References

External links 
Kahn Brothers web site
 New York Stock Exchange profile, Dec. 30, 2005
 Gurufocus.com profile
New York Society of Security Analysts
Jewish Foundation for the Education of Women
NYSSA Honors Irving Kahn – with pictures of Irving Kahn

1905 births
2015 deaths
American financial analysts
American financial company founders
American centenarians
American investment advisors
American investors
American money managers
American stockbrokers
American stock traders
Men centenarians
CFA charterholders
City College of New York alumni
Columbia Business School alumni
Businesspeople from New York City
20th-century American businesspeople